The Vultee V-1 was a 1930s American single-engined airliner built by the Airplane Development Corporation, designed by Gerard Vultee and financed by automobile manufacturer Errett Cord.

Design and development
The prototype (designated the V-1) was an all-metal low-wing cantilever monoplane with a retractable tailwheel landing gear. It had accommodation for a pilot and six passengers and first flew on February 19, 1933.

The production aircraft were designated the V-1A and had a slightly larger and longer fuselage for two pilots and eight passengers.  Production ended in 1936 after 24 aircraft plus the prototype had been built.

A floatplane version, sold to the USSR along a manufacturing license was designated V-1AS and an executive transport version was designated V-1AD (for Deluxe). No production ensued in the USSR.

Operational history

American Airlines bought at least 13 V-1As and the V-1 prototype (after it had been modified for two pilot operation) and they entered service in 1934. On introduction, they were the fastest commercial airliners of their day. They were used on routes from the Great Lakes to Texas. Bowen Airlines of Texas also operated the type. By 1936, they were sold, having been replaced with twin-engined aircraft when the Bureau of Air Commerce severely limited the use of single engine airliners.

V-1ADs were operated by several private companies or individuals as high-speed executive aircraft. The sole V-1AD Special was used prewar by newspaper magnate Randolph Hearst. It later served airlines in Panama and Nicaragua before returning to the United States postwar.

Fitted with twin floats and extra fuel tanks, the sole V-1AS Special was sold to the Soviet Union and used for a 10,000 mile Santa Monica to Moscow flight.

A V-1AD was used in 1936 during an attempt at the first New York-London-New York double crossing, flown by Harry Richman and Henry T. "Dick" Merrill, in the famous "Ping Pong" flight, when to ensure buoyancy in case of ditching, empty spaces in the aircraft were filled with ping pong balls. It was later used by Nationalist forces in Spain as a transport and high speed bomber.

Seven former American Airlines aircraft, plus eight others were used by the Republicans in the Spanish Civil War, with machine guns and under-fuselage bomb racks fitted. Four of the aircraft were captured by the Nationalists.

The V-1 was used in the filming of Jungle Queen (1944) with Clark Gable, and The Tarnished Angels (1957).

Variants
V-1
Prototype with a  Wright SR-1820-F2 Cyclone engine, one built, later modified to V-1A standard before delivery to American Airlines.
V-1A
Production variant with two crew and a  Wright Cyclone R-1820-F2 radial engine, 18-built and one converted from prototype.
V-1AD
Deluxe executive variant with a  Wright Cyclone R-1820-G2 radial engine, six built.
V-1AD Special
As V-1AD but fitted with a  Wright Cyclone R-1820-G2 radial engine, one built.
V-1AS Special
Special variant with either  R-1820-F52 or  R-1820-G2 radial engine, with twin floats, one built for the Russian government.

Survivors

It is painted as Lady Peace II to commemorate the original Lady Peace used for the double crossing attempt. It was restored and flown in 1971 by Harold Johnston from Colorado.

Operators

 Spanish Republican Air Force – Republican Spain purchased 16 V-1s from various sources, including 10 from American Airlines. At least one was destroyed by sabotage before delivery and four more were seized by Nationalists during delivery. 

 Aviación Nacional

Civil operators

Canadian Colonial Airways

China National Aviation Corporation

American Airlines (1 V-1 and 10 V-1A) 
Bowen Airlines
Crusader Oil Corporation
William Randolph Hearst

Specifications (V-1A)

See also

References

Notes

Bibliography
 Andersson, Lennart. A History of Chinese Aviation: Encyclopedia of Aircraft and Aviation in China to 1949. Taipei, Republic of China: AHS of ROC, 2008. .

 Davies, R.E.G. Airlines of the United States. McLean, Virginia: Paladwr Press Inc, 1998. .
 The Illustrated Encyclopedia of Aircraft (Part Work 1982–1985). London: Orbis Publishing, 1985.
 King, Jack. Wings of Man: The Legend of Dick Merrill. Seattle: Aviation Book Co., 1981. .
 Ogden, Bob. Aviation Museums and Collections of North America. Tonbridge, Kent: Air-Britain (Historians) Ltd, 2007. . Page 541.
 Pattillo, Donald M. Pushing the Envelope: The American Aircraft Industry. Ann Arbor, Michigan: University of Michigan Press, 2001. .
 Richard, Allen S. "Jerry Vultee's V1." Air Classics Magazine, Challenge Publications, June 1976.
 Wegg, John. General Dynamic Aircraft and their Predecessors. London: Putnam, 1990. .

External links

 Vultee Aircraft, on Aerofiles

V-1
1930s United States airliners
Single-engined tractor aircraft
Low-wing aircraft
Aircraft first flown in 1933